Flying officer (Fg Off in the RAF and IAF;  in the RAAF;  in the RNZAF; formerly F/O in all services and still frequently in the RAF) is a junior commissioned rank in the Royal Air Force (RAF) and the air forces of many countries which have historical British influence. It is also sometimes used as the English translation of an equivalent rank in countries which have a non-English air force-specific rank structure. In these cases a flying officer usually ranks above pilot officer and immediately below flight lieutenant.

It has a NATO ranking code of OF-1 and is equivalent to a lieutenant in the British Army or the Royal Marines. However, it is superior to the nearest equivalent rank of sub-lieutenant in the Royal Navy. 

The equivalent rank in the Women's Auxiliary Air Force was "section officer".

Origins
The term "flying officer" was originally used in the Royal Flying Corps as a flying appointment for junior officers, not a rank.

On 1 April 1918, the newly created RAF adopted its officer rank titles from the British Army, with Royal Naval Air Service sub-lieutenants (entitled flight sub-lieutenants) and Royal Flying Corps lieutenants becoming lieutenants in the RAF. However, with the creation of the RAF's own rank structure in August 1919, RAF lieutenants were re-titled flying officers, a rank which has been in continuous use ever since.

Usage
The rank title does not imply that an officer in the rank of flying officer flies. Some flying officers are aircrew, but many are ground branch officers.  Amongst the ground branches some flying officers have command of flights.

In the RAF, aircrew and engineer officers are commissioned directly into the rank of flying officer, while ground branches are commissioned as pilot officers for an initial period of six months. Time served in the rank of flying officer varies depending on branch before automatic promotion to flight lieutenant; aircrew and BEng qualified officers will serve for a period of 2½ years, MEng qualified engineers for 1½ years, and all other ground branches for 3½ years. A graduate entrant who has an MEng but is joining a ground branch other than engineer will serve 3½ years as a flying officer – the early promotion for MEng engineers is designed as a recruitment incentive. The starting salary for a flying officer is £30,616.80 per year.

In many cases the rank of flying officer is the first rank an air force officer holds after successful completion of his professional training. A flying officer might serve as a pilot in training, an adjutant, a security officer or an administrative officer and is typically given charge of personnel and/or resources. By the time aviators have completed their training, they will have served their 2½ years and typically join their frontline squadrons as flight lieutenants.

Insignia
The rank insignia consists of one narrow blue band on slightly wider black band. This is worn on both the lower sleeves of the tunic or on the shoulders of the flying suit or the casual uniform.  The rank insignia on the mess uniform is similar to the naval pattern, being one band of gold running around each cuff but without the Royal Navy's loop.

Other air forces
The rank of flying officer is also used in a number of the air forces in the Commonwealth, including the Bangladesh Air Force, Indian Air Force (IAF), Namibian Air Force, Pakistan Air Force (PAF), Royal Australian Air Force (RAAF),  Nigeria Air Force (NAF) and Royal New Zealand Air Force (RNZAF).

The Royal Canadian Air Force (RCAF) used the rank until unification of the three armed services into the Canadian Forces in 1968 and army-type ranks were adopted. RCAF personnel holding this rank then switched to the rank of lieutenant. In official French Canadian usage, a flying officer's rank title was lieutenant d'aviation.  Although the RCAF again became a named organization in the Canadian Forces in 2011, the RCAF retained army-type ranks.

The rank of "warrant flying officer" was also used by the air service of the Imperial Japanese military.

This rank is the equivalent of a lieutenant in the Royal Malaysian Air Force.

See also

 Air force officer rank insignia
 British and U.S. military ranks compared
 Comparative military ranks
 RAF officer ranks
 Ranks of the RAAF
 Flight officer

References

Military ranks of the Commonwealth
Military ranks of Australia
Former military ranks of Canada
Military ranks of the Royal Air Force
Air force ranks
Pakistan Air Force ranks
Military ranks of Bangladesh
Military ranks of Sri Lanka
Military ranks of the Indian Air Force